Jim Cordle (born August 22, 1987) is a former American football center that played in the National Football League (NFL). He was signed by the New York Giants as an undrafted free agent in 2011. He was part of the Giants team that won Super Bowl XLVI over the New England Patriots. He played college football for the Ohio State University. Cordle was previously the offensive line coach and offensive coordinator at Long Island University. He is currently the offensive coordinator and offensive line coach at Ohio Northern.
Father is Jim Cordle who was a teacher for special education.

References

External links
 LIU profile
 Ohio State profile

1987 births
Living people
American football centers
LIU Sharks football coaches
New York Giants players
Ohio State Buckeyes football coaches
Ohio State Buckeyes football players
Urbana Blue Knights football coaches
People from Lancaster, Ohio
Coaches of American football from Ohio
Players of American football from Ohio